Allium geyeri is a North American species of onion widespread in the western United States and in western Canada. It is found in the Rocky Mountain States from New Mexico to Idaho, Great Basin, the Pacific Northwest, Texas, South Dakota, Arizona, Manitoba, British Columbia, Alberta and Saskatchewan.

varieties
Allium geyeri var. chatterleyi S.L.Welsh - Abajo Mountains in Utah
Allium geyeri var. geyeri  - much of species range
Allium geyeri var. tenerum M.E.Jones - much of species range

Allium geyeri produces narrowly elongate bulbs up to 25 mm long. Flowering stalks can reach up to 50 cm in height. Flowers are bell-shaped to urn-shaped, pink to white with yellow pollen.

References

External links
 
 

geyeri
Flora of Western Canada
Flora of the Western United States
Flora of the Rocky Mountains
Onions
Plants described in 1879
Taxa named by Sereno Watson